Russell Johnston was a politician.

Russell Johnston(e) may also refer to:

Russell Johnston (footballer)
Russell Irvin Johnston, creator of Double-elimination tournament
Russell Johnstone, Australian equestrian

See also
Russell Johnson (disambiguation)